Rajesh Kumar Manjhi (born 12 April 1968) was a member of the 14th Lok Sabha of India. He represented the Gaya constituency of Bihar and is a member of the Rashtriya Janata Dal (RJD) political party. | now they stay separate Rajesh Kumar Manjhi didn't get divorce from her wife Pramila kumari. The family court dismissed the case after 7 years. Rajesh kumar manjhi now leave with his wife from last 5 year.

Suspension 
Manjhi was suspended from 30 sittings of the Lok Sabha in 2007 for taking a female friend on an official tour and presenting her as his wife.

References

1968 births
Living people
People from Bihar
India MPs 2004–2009
Rashtriya Janata Dal politicians
Lok Sabha members from Bihar
People from Gaya, India